Vanstiphout is a surname. Notable people with the surname include:

 (1941–2019), Dutch assyriologist
Jos Vanstiphout (1951–2013), Belgian sports psychologist
Tom Vanstiphout (born 1975), Belgian guitarist and singer